"Zaddy" is a song by American singer Ty Dolla Sign. It was released on August 25, 2016, as the third single from his ninth mixtape, Campaign (2016). The song was written by Tyrone Griffin, Jr., Jay Cummings, Adam Feeney, and Jahaan Sweet, with the production being helmed by the latter two.

Background and release
In June 2016, Ty Dolla Sign announced his new mixtape, Campaign. On July 11, 2016, he released the title track lead single featuring Future. The second single, "No Justice" featuring Ty's brother Big TC, was released on July 21. On July 24, Ty shared the mixtape's track listing, which included "Zaddy" as the seventh track. He released "Zaddy" as the mixtape's third single on August 25, 2016.

Critical reception
Pigeons & Planes named "Zaddy" as one of the best songs of September 2016. Complex placed it at number 37 on its The 50 Best Songs of 2016 list.

Music video
The music video for "Zaddy" was filmed in Tokyo, Japan, and was inspired by 2015 science fiction psychological thriller, Ex Machina. The video premiered via Ty Dolla Sign's YouTube channel on August 30, 2016.

Charts

Release history

In popular culture
Zaddy passed into slang culture as a term for a good-looking, fashionable man with "swag".

References

2016 singles
2016 songs
Ty Dolla Sign songs
Songs written by Ty Dolla Sign
Songs written by Frank Dukes
Song recordings produced by Frank Dukes